Tay Ninh Football Club, is a professional football club, based in Tây Ninh, Vietnam. The team is currently participating in the Vietnam National Championship Division Three.

Achievements

National competitions
League
Second League:
 Winners : 2013, 2015
 Runners-up : 2005

Current squads 
As of December 2020

References

External links

Football clubs in Vietnam
Association football clubs established in 1976
1976 establishments in Vietnam